United Jharkhand Party, a political party in India. Founded in 1948 by Justin Richard. Jaipal Singh, a leader of the Adivasi Mahasabha, joined the party. Later Singh would launch the Jharkhand Party.

Another party with the same name appeared in Indian politics in 1991.

Political parties in Jharkhand
Political parties established in 1948
1948 establishments in India